Cees Haast (19 November 1938 – 18 January 2019) was a Dutch cyclist. His sporting career began with Fortuna Zundert.

Major results
1962
2nd of Ronde van Limburg
2nd of Delta Profronde
1964
2nd of the Dutch National Road Race Championships
1966
7th and 13th stages of the Vuelta a España
2nd of the Dutch National Road Race Championships
8th of Vuelta a España
1967
5th of the Vuelta a España
1968
3rd stage of Tour of Luxembourg
2nd of the Tour of Luxembourg

Results on the major tours

Tour de France
1964: 39th
1965: DNF
1966: 36th
1967: 14th
1969: 63rd

Vuelta a España
1966: 8th, winner of the 7th and 13th stages
1967: 5th
1968: 20th
1969: 32nd

Giro d'Italia
1968 Giro d'Italia: 22nd

References

1938 births
2019 deaths
Dutch male cyclists
Cyclists from Zundert
Cyclists from Rucphen
20th-century Dutch people